Hamidou Tembine (born November 4, 1982, in Orsongo, Dogon Country, West Africa) is a French game theorist and researcher specializing in evolutionary games and co-opetitive mean-field-type games. He has been a Global Network Assistant Professor at New York University. He has been also the principal investigator and director of the Game Theory and Learning Laboratory (L&G Lab) at New York University.

Tembine has written about 300 research articles, 3 books, and co-edited 3 books. His research is focused in the areas of auto-regulation, self-regulation, knowledge-based economy and variance minimization of tokens in emerging markets.

Early life and education 
Tembine received an M.S. in Applied Mathematics from École Polytechnique in Paris in 2006 and a Ph.D. in computer science from University of Avignon in 2009. His thesis was entitled 'Population Games with Networking Applications' and was supervised by Eitan Altman and Rachid El-Azouzi.

Career 
In 2010, Tembine was appointed as Assistant Professor at Ecole Superieure d’Electricite, Supelec (now Ecole CentraleSupelec), France and taught there until 2013. In 2014, he joined the New York University as Global Network Assistant Professor. He is the principal investigator of the Learning  and Game Theory Laboratory (L&G Lab) at NYU, NYC and Abu Dhabi campuses.

Tembine has been the Associate Editor of IEEE Access, of Games, and of AIMS Electronic Engineering since 2017. He has been a game theory consultant, blockchain token economics advisor, senior research scientist at several companies since 2004.

Work 
As the director of L&G Lab, Tembine developed a risk engineering tool based on mean-field-type game theory. The tool was applied to engineering in the areas of multilevel building evacuation, smart energy systems, network security, transportation and mobility and blockchain token economics. The model was further applied to social sciences, user's empathy and psychology, deep strategy and deep learning.

Tembine established equivalence between a class of multi-agent distributionally robust generative adversarial networks under various divergence notions and variance-aware distributionally robust games. Mean-field-type filters, which are filters that depend on the distribution of the state, were first proposed by L&G Lab members. They provided explicit solutions to a class of mean-field-type games with non-linear state dynamics and or non-quadratic cost functions. The non-linearity includes trigonometric functions, hyperbolic functions, logarithmic functions and power (polynomial) cost functions.

Tembine has worked on game theory with small, medium and large number of interacting agents. He also contributed to the design, analysis, and implementation of distributed strategic learning. He has established relationships between the domains of strategic learning, evolutionary game dynamics and Kolmogorov forward equations (Markov jump processes). The results were applied to resource allocation problems, user's satisfaction problems, queue-aware power control and allocation problems.

Tembine has participated in several projects in West Africa in the areas of informal economy, knowledge-based economy and blockchain token economy. He tested low-cost, self-configurable, solar-power equipment that requires less maintenance in several areas. His conclusion was to base the entire project on a significant participation of the local population. The evidence from these projects showed that when the involvement of the local population is high, the maintenance and the followup were better done by themselves. To improve efficiency, he suggested private portion of the field to be shared depending on the needs of the local population.

Awards and honors 
2011 - Best paper award at International Workshop on Future Media Networks and IP-based TV at IEEE INFOCOM (International Conference on Computer Communications)
2014 - EMEA Outstanding Young Researcher Award, Communications Society, Institute of Electrical and Electronics Engineers
2016 - Best Paper Award, International Conference on Electrical Energy and Networks
2017 - Next Einstein Fellow
2017 - Best Paper Award, The International Conference on Wireless Networks and Mobile Communications

Selected publications

Books 

Mean-Field-Type Games for Engineers  (2021)
Game Theory and Learning for Wireless Networks: Fundamentals and Applications (2011)
Distributed Strategic Learning for Wireless Engineers (2012)

Articles 
J. Barreiro-Gomez, H. Tembine: Blockchain Token Economics: A Mean-Field-Type Game Perspective, IEEE Access, volume 7, 2019
J. Gao and H. Tembine,  Distributed Mean-Field-Type Filters for Traffic Networks, IEEE Transactions on Intelligent Transportation Systems, vol. 20, Issue2, pp. 507–521, Feb. 2019.
T. E. Duncan and H. Tembine. Linear-Quadratic Mean-Field-Type Games: A Direct Method, Games Journal,  9(1), 7, 2018
B. Djehiche, A. Tcheukam, H. Tembine. Mean-Field-Type Games in Engineering. AIMS Electronics and Electrical Engineering, 1(1): 18-73, 2017
H. Tembine: Mean-Field-Type Games,  AIMS Mathematics, 2(4): 706-735, 2017
M. Khan and H. Tembine: Meta-Learning for Realizing Self-x Management of Future Networks, IEEE Access Journal, vol.5, pp. 19072 – 19083,  August 2017
Kody J.H. Law, H. Tembine, R. Tempone: Deterministic Mean-Field Ensemble Kalman Filtering,  SIAM: SIAM Journal on Scientific Computing (SISC), 2016, A1251-A1279.
A. Farhan Hanif, H. Tembine, M. Assaad, D. Zeghlache, Mean-field games for resource sharing in cloud based networks, IEEE/ACM Transactions on Networking,  24(1): 624-637 (2016) DOI: 10.1109/TNET.2014.2387100, 2016. 
H. Tembine, Q. Zhu, T. Basar, Risk-sensitive mean-field games, IEEE Transactions on Automatic Control, volume 59 (2014), Issue 4, April 2014.
H. Tembine, Energy-constrained Mean-Field Games in Wireless Networks, Strategic Behavior and the Environment, 4, no. 2 (2014): 187-211. doi: 10.1561/102.00000040. Special Issue on: ICT-based strategies for environmental conflicts.
H. Tembine: Risk-Sensitive Mean-Field-Type Games with Lp-norm Drifts, Automatica, volume 59, September 2015, pages 224-237.
H. Tembine, Nonasymptotic mean-field games,  IEEE Transactions on Systems, Man, and Cybernetics, Part B: Cybernetics,  vol. 44, number 12, December 2014.
H. Tembine, R. Tempone, P. Vilanova, Mean field games for cognitive radio networks, 2012 American Control Conference (ACC), pages 6388-6393.
H. Tembine: Dynamic Robust Games in MIMO systems, IEEE Transactions on Systems, Man, Cybernetics, Part B, 99, Volume: 41, Issue: 4, pp. 990 – 1002, August 2011
H. Tembine, E. Altman, R. ElAzouzi, Y. Hayel, Evolutionary Games in Wireless Networks,    IEEE Transactions on Systems, Man, and Cybernetics, Part B: Cybernetics, vol. 40, issue 3, pp. 634–646, 2010.

References 

Game theorists
Living people
1982 births
University of Avignon alumni
New York University faculty